The men's light welterweight (63.5 kg/139.7 lbs) Full-Contact category at the W.A.K.O. World Championships 2007 in Coimbra was the fifth lightest of the male Full-Contact tournaments, involving nineteen fighters from four continents (Europe, Asia, Africa and North America).  Each of the matches was three rounds of two minutes each and were fought under Full-Contact rules.  

As there were not enough fighters for a thirty-two man tournament, thirteen of the men received byes through to the second round.  The tournament gold medallist was Mardan Buzdaev from Kazakhstan who won by walkover against Italian Andrea Scaglione, who could not participate in the final.  Brian Dickson from Canada and Tomasz Pietraszewski from Poland were rewarded with bronze medals for reaching the semi finals.

Results

Key

See also
List of WAKO Amateur World Championships
List of WAKO Amateur European Championships
List of male kickboxers

References

External links
 WAKO World Association of Kickboxing Organizations Official Site

Kickboxing events at the WAKO World Championships 2007 Coimbra
2007 in kickboxing
Kickboxing in Portugal